Brocton Arch is a historic "welcome arch" located at Brocton in Chautauqua County, New York. It is a freestanding steel arch bearing the community's name constructed in 1913 over a public thoroughfare.  It is a rare double span, four way street arch.

It was listed on the National Register of Historic Places in 1996.

Beginning in 2012, the Arch was taken down for refurbishing. The Arch was put back up about a year later.

References

Buildings and structures on the National Register of Historic Places in New York (state)
Buildings and structures completed in 1913
Buildings and structures in Chautauqua County, New York
1913 establishments in New York (state)
National Register of Historic Places in Chautauqua County, New York